Katha Saghral , (or Katha Saghral) is a village and union council (an administrative subdivision) of Khushab District located in Punjab, Pakistan.

Overview
Katha Saghral is part of Khushab tehsil, the village is situated 25 km from Khushab on the Rawalpindi-Peshawar Road. It is semi-hilly and mineral area.  Dozens of minerals including coal and salt are being mined in the surrounding area of this village.  The population of this village is associated with agriculture and tomato is the famous cultivation of the area.

References 

Union councils of Khushab District
Populated places in Khushab District